Polski Trambesh Municipality is a municipality (obshtina) in Veliko Tarnovo Province, Central-North Bulgaria, located in the Danubian Plain. It is named after its administrative centre - the town of Polski Trambesh.

The main road E85 crosses the area centrally, from south to north, connecting the province centre of Veliko Tarnovo with the city of Ruse.

Settlements 

Polski Trambesh Municipality includes the following 15 places (towns are shown in bold):

Demography 
The following table shows the change of the population during the last four decades.

Bulgarians form a majority in 14 out of 15 settlements. One village, Petko Karavelovo, has a Turkish majority with 58,7% of its population belonging to the Turkish minority in Bulgaria. The village of Radanovo has the largest Roma population in the municipality of  Polski Trambesh, with 367 out of 508 Roma living in the village of Radanovo. Roma make up 29,0% of the population of the village of Radanovo.

See also
Provinces of Bulgaria
Municipalities of Bulgaria
List of cities and towns in Bulgaria

References

External links
 Official website 

Municipalities in Veliko Tarnovo Province